The third quarterback rule was a rule in the National Football League from 1991 to 2010 that governed the use of a third quarterback in addition to the starter and the backup.  The rule was abolished for the 2011 season, when the NFL increased the roster size to allow 46 players to dress for a game.

In 2010, the last year the rule was in effect, teams could dress 45 players for game day. If they had two quarterbacks dressed for the game, they were allowed to dress a third quarterback who did not count toward that limit. However, if the third quarterback entered the game at any position before the third quarter ended, the starter and backup quarterbacks became ineligible to play for the rest of the game. The third quarterback, however, could play in the fourth quarter while preserving the eligibility of the starter and backup.

The full text of the rule was:
Teams will be permitted an Active List of 45 players and an Inactive List of eight players for each regular-season and postseason game. Provided, that if a club has two quarterbacks on its 45-player Active List, a third quarterback from its Inactive List is permitted to dress for the game, but if he enters the game during the first three quarters, the other two quarterbacks are thereafter prohibited from playing.

Although it is not specifically indicated, the NFL had interpreted its rule to mean that in order to designate a third quarterback, the two on the active roster must both be "bona fide" quarterbacks, not other position players merely designated as quarterbacks.

History
The third quarterback rule was instituted for the 1991 NFL season in reaction to a  game between the Washington Redskins and the Philadelphia Eagles. In that game, sometimes called the "Body Bag Game", the Redskins lost both starting quarterback Jeff Rutledge and backup Stan Humphries to injuries. Without a third quarterback on their active roster, the Redskins had to use a player unsuited for that position. Brian Mitchell, a running back who played quarterback in college, completed the game in the quarterback position. The Eagles defeated the Redskins, 28–14.

The rule was nearly triggered in Week 1 in  when Tom Tupa went into a game for the New York Jets against the New England Patriots after starter Vinny Testaverde tore his Achilles tendon and was lost for the season during the first quarter. Head coach Bill Parcells made the decision before the game to have Tupa (who was primarily a punter but was drafted as a quarterback in 1988) as the backup quarterback and Rick Mirer as the emergency quarterback. Had Parcells put Mirer in before the fourth quarter, Tupa would not have been allowed to play for even his normal punting duties. Tupa went 6-of-11 for 165 yards and two touchdowns and kept the game close before the fourth quarter hit and Parcells was able to replace Tupa with Mirer at quarterback without penalty.

In the 2010 NFC Championship Game between the Green Bay Packers and Chicago Bears, the rule was triggered with 57 seconds left in the third quarter. The Bears' starting quarterback, Jay Cutler, suffered from an MCL sprain just after halftime. His replacement, Todd Collins, was pulled after throwing four poor passes including two near interceptions in what would be his final NFL game of his  16-year career. When Caleb Hanie, the Bears' designated third quarterback entered the game before the fourth quarter, it meant that the Bears could not return either Cutler or Collins to the field the rest of the game. Hanie played well and almost led the Bears back from a 14–0 deficit, but the Packers won the game, 21–14.

In the 2011 season, the active roster was increased to 46 players, and the ability to dress an extra quarterback was revoked. In 2020, the collective bargaining agreement added a similar rule for offensive linemen: teams can dress 48 players for game day provided they have at least eight linemen active; if they do not, they can only have 47 players dressed.

Notes

American football terminology